The Noble and Greenough School, commonly known as Nobles, is a coeducational, nonsectarian day and five-day boarding school for students in grades seven through twelve. It is near Boston on a  campus that borders the Charles River in Dedham, Massachusetts. The current enrollment of 614 students includes a balance of boys and girls. The boarding program hosts 45 students who live on campus five days a week. The majority of students are from Massachusetts, neighboring states, and occasionally from abroad. In recent history, all members of the senior class go on to accredited four-year colleges and universities. In 2010, Nobles was ranked as the 18th best prep school in the United States by Forbes. Nobles has 134 faculty members, with a student to faculty ratio of approximately 6:1. The average class size is 12. Tuition for the 2021-2022 academic year is $55,700 for day students and $61,700 for five-day boarding students. Nobles' historic athletic rival is Milton Academy.

The Noble and Greenough Middle School consists of 122 students in the 7th and 8th grades, with approximately 60 students in each grade. The middle school has a different afternoon activities program from the upper school. Not all students start in the middle school at Nobles.

History
Nobles was founded in 1866 by George Washington Copp Noble, in Boston, Massachusetts, as an all-boys preparatory school for Harvard University. It became known as Noble & Greenough in 1892. During World War I, the school merged with Boston-based Volkman School, which had faced a drastically declining student population due to the headmaster's German origins. There is a monument to the Volkman School on the Nobles campus. In 1922, the school moved from Boston to its current location in Dedham. The property had previously been the estate of Albert W. Nickerson. The grounds were designed by Frederick Law Olmsted. The school discontinued its lower school at this time, which caused parents to start the Dexter School, to fill the gap created. In 1975, Nobles began admitting girls.

Athletics at Nobles
Nobles is a member of the Independent School League. The school has 25 varsity teams. Boys and girls participate in soccer, cross-country, hockey, basketball, squash, skiing, golf, lacrosse, tennis, crew, and the newly formed ultimate frisbee team. Boys also participate in football, wrestling, and baseball, while girls participate in volleyball, field hockey and softball.

Former Boston College hockey players, goalie, John Muse (AHL), and forwards, Miles Wood (NHL), Jimmy Hayes (NHL) and younger brother Kevin Hayes (NHL), attended Nobles. Chris Huxley, Harvard Captain

Nobles and Milton Academy historically have a Nobles/Milton Day each athletic season. On this day, usually nearing or on the last game of the season, the two schools compete in almost every sport.

Notable graduates

Notable alumni of Noble and Greenough include:

 Justin Alfond, class of 1994, president of the Maine State Senate
 Bill Arnold, class of 2010, former professional hockey player for the Calgary Flames
 Arthur Everett Austin Jr., director of the Wadsworth Atheneum
 Michael Beach, class of 1982, actor featured in ER, Third Watch
 Ayla Brown, class of 2006, singer and daughter of Massachusetts Senator Scott Brown
 Michael Jude Christodal, class of 1986, recording artist, songwriter
 Chris Cleary, class of 1998, professional soccer player
 Harry Crosby, founder of the Black Sun Press
 Robert Dunham, American actor
 Keith Elam, member of Gang Starr, aka Guru
 Selden Edwards, class of 1959, best-selling novelist
 Mark Fayne, class of 2006, former professional hockey player for New Jersey Devils
 Richard P. Freeman, class of 1888, U.S. Representative
 Seth Goldman, class of 1983, cofounder, president and CEO of Honest Tea
 Wycliffe Grousbeck, class of 1979, co-owner of the Boston Celtics
 Tucker Halpern, class of 2009, member of the Grammy-nominated DJ duo Sofi Tukker
 Kevin Hayden, class of 1986, Suffolk County district attorney
 Jimmy Hayes, class of 2008, former professional hockey player for the Boston Bruins
 Kevin Hayes, class of 2010, current professional hockey player for the Philadelphia Flyers 
 Melvin Johnson, class of 1927, weapons designer, Harvard professor
 Jonathan Kozol, class of 1954, educator, activist & author
 Mr. Lif, rap artist
 Clarence Cook Little, class of 1906, biologist and president of University of Michigan
 Royal Little, class of 1915, founder of Fortune 500 company Textron and "father of conglomerates"
 A. Lawrence Lowell, class of 1873, President of Harvard (1909–1933)
 Guy Lowell, class of 1888, architect of the Boston Museum of Fine Arts and the New York State Supreme Courthouse 
 Percival Lowell, class of 1872, astronomer
 Ralph Lowell, class of 1907, banker and philanthropist
 Francis Peabody Magoun, World War I ace and scholar of languages and literature
 Samuel Eliot Morison, class of 1901, American historian and author
 Albert Nickerson, class of 1929, former chief executive of Mobil Oil and chairman of Federal Reserve Bank of New York
 Sarah Parsons, class of 2005, member of the 2006 Olympic ice hockey team
 William Phillips, class of 1896, United States diplomat
 Roger Putnam, American politician and businessman
 Helen Resor, class of 2004, member of the 2006 Olympic ice hockey team
 Alexander H. Rice Jr., class of 1894, physician and explorer of South America
 Leverett Saltonstall, class of 1910, governor of Massachusetts (1939–1945) and United States Senator (1945–1967)
 Francis Sargent, class of 1935, governor of Massachusetts (1969–1975)
 Henry Lee Shattuck, class of 1897, attorney, philanthropist and politician
 Mayo A. Shattuck III, American businessman, CEO of Constellation Energy
 Louis Agassiz Shaw, inventor of the iron lung, Harvard professor
 Courtney Sims, class of 2003, NBA Basketball player
 Warren Cummings Smith, class of 2011, 2014 Winter Olympics alpine skier
 Robert Storer, former Harvard University football player and decorated war hero
 Karen Thatcher, class of 2002, Olympic women's hockey player for Team USA
 J. Rupert Thompson, class of 1986, reality television show producer
 Chris Tierney, class of 2004, professional soccer player, New England Revolution
 Amor Towles, class of 1983, best-selling novelist
 George Clapp Vaillant, anthropologist and author
 Dan Weinstein, class of 1999, Olympic speed skater
 Colin White, class of 2015, current NHL forward for the Florida Panthers
 James N. Wood, class of 1959, former president and CEO of the J. Paul Getty Trust
 Miles Wood, class of 2015, current professional hockey player for the New Jersey Devils

References

External links
 

1866 establishments in Massachusetts
Boarding schools in Massachusetts
Co-educational boarding schools
Educational institutions established in 1866
Independent School League
Private high schools in Massachusetts
Private middle schools in Massachusetts
Private preparatory schools in Massachusetts
Schools in Dedham, Massachusetts